Launiupoko is an unincorporated community and census-designated place on the island of Maui in Maui County, Hawaii, United States. Its population was 688 as of the 2020 census. The community is located on the west side of the island.

Launiupoko Beach Park is a park located near the beach in the community, managed by the county of Maui. It is 6.7 acres in size, and is ADA accessible. There are sixteen picnic tables and ten barbecues, and 90 parking spots in total, with 50 of those being across the highway. It has one outdoor shower, one restroom, and two payphones.

Geography

Demographics

References

Populated places on Maui
Unincorporated communities in Maui County, Hawaii
Unincorporated communities in Hawaii
Census-designated places in Maui County, Hawaii
Populated coastal places in Hawaii